Christaller is a surname. Notable people with the surname include:

Helene Christaller (1872–1953), German writer
Emilie Christaller (1829–1866), German missionary and educator
Johann Gottlieb Christaller (1827–1895), German missionary and linguist
Walter Christaller, German geographer